Abbas Ali (born September 3, 1990) is a Pakistani professional footballer, who plays for National Bank. Naturally a defensive midfielder, Ali can also play as centre-back. He has also represented Pakistan national football team.

Aged only 15, he earned his first international cap during the 2007 AFC Asian Cup qualifiers in 2006.

Because of his powerful physique despite his average height, as well as aggressive approach to the game, he has been dubbed as "Dynamite Kid" by some Pakistani football fans.

Club career

National Bank
Ali made his debut in 2005–06 Pakistan Premier League at the age of 15. He played six out of 22 matches. He scored his first goal in the 2006–07 season against Pakistan Navy, scoring the winner in 89th minute on December 14, 2006.

Ali started playing more a defensive midfielder rather than a centre-back for the 2007–08 season. Ali scored crucial goals for National Bank, scoring an equaliser against Habib Bank on 15 November 2007, National Bank won the match 2–1. Ali scored his second goal of the season on 5 December, when he scored the lone goal of the match against Khan Research Laboratories at 36th minutes. Ali once again scored the winner for National Bank, as he scored the only goal of the match against Pakistan Navy at 15th minutes. On 5 January 2008, Ali scored the equaliser against Pakistan Television at 68th minute as the match ended in a 1–1 draw. His fifth and last goal of the season came against PMC Club Athletico in a 5–2 victory.

Ali scored in the National Bank's opening match against Karachi Electric Supply Corporation, scoring equaliser on 37th minute, although National Bank lost the match 2–1. Ali scored in a 6–2 win over Afghan Chaman, Ali achieved a special feat in the match as he became the first player in the history of Pakistan Premier League to score a goal and an own goal in the same match when he scored for National Bank at 75th minute and earlier at 30th minute scored an own goal.  On 22 October 2008, Ali scored a brace against Pakistan Steel, scoring goals in 22nd and 81st minutes.

In the 2009–10 season Ali scored only one goal, he scored the equaliser against WAPDA in 75th minutes, two minutes after Zulfiqar Shah had given the lead to WAPDA. Ali with National Bank finished 10th, their lowest ranking ever.

References

1990 births
Living people
Pakistani footballers
Pakistan international footballers
Footballers at the 2006 Asian Games
Footballers at the 2010 Asian Games
Association football defenders
Asian Games competitors for Pakistan